Hugo Herrnhof (born September 21, 1964 in Bolzano) is an Italian retired short track speed skater who competed in the 1988 Winter Olympics, 1992 Winter Olympics and 1994 Winter Olympics.

Career
Herrnhof competed in the short track speed skating events at the 1988 Winter Olympics when this sport was a demonstration sport. He was a member of the Italian relay team which finished second in the 5000 metre relay.

Though he never reached the top individually in major international competitions, he finished second in 500 m and third in 3000 m and  fourth in the overall standings at the 1990 World Short Track Speed Skating Championships.
One year later he earns a bronze medal over 1500 m  and finishing 7th  in the overall classification at the World Short Track Speed Skating Championships 1991 in Sydney Australia.
Two years later Herrnhof finished eighth with the Italian team in the 5000 metre relay at the 1992 Winter Olympics. In the 1000 metres he finished 12th.

At the 1994 Winter Olympics Herrnhof won the gold medal in the 5000 metre relay as a member of the Italian team alongside Maurizio Carnino, Orazio Fagone and Mirko Vuillermin.

Post-career
After his skating career, Herrnhof became an administrator. From 2002 to 2006 he was working as Sports Manager for Speed Skating and Short Track at the Organizing committee of the 2006  Torino Olympic Winter Games. In September  2006, Hernnhof became Speed Skating Sports Director for the International Skating Union, having served for several years as a board member in the Italian Ice Sports Federation. Originate from Brunico, Herrnhof today is living in Piemonte and is married to a former short track speed skater, Cristina Sciolla, who participated in the 1988 and 1992 Winter Olympics.

References

External links
 
 
 

1964 births
Living people
Italian male short track speed skaters
Olympic short track speed skaters of Italy
Olympic gold medalists for Italy
Olympic medalists in short track speed skating
Short track speed skaters at the 1988 Winter Olympics
Short track speed skaters at the 1992 Winter Olympics
Short track speed skaters at the 1994 Winter Olympics
Medalists at the 1994 Winter Olympics
Sportspeople from the Province of Sondrio